Ulithian is the language spoken on Ulithi Atoll and neighboring islands. Ulithian is one of the six official languages of the Federated States of Micronesia. There are some 3,000 speakers, although only 700 of these live on Ulithi Atoll.

In 2010, a UlithianEnglish and EnglishUlithian dictionary was published by Habele, a US-based charity. The authors' stated aim was to create a consistent and intuitive pattern of Roman alphabet spelling useful for both native Ulithian and native English speakers.

Introduction

History
Ulithian is a language spoken in Micronesia. The specific islands that Ulithian is spoken in are Ulithi, Ngulu, Sorol, Fais Islands and Eastern Caroline Islands. There are also a few speakers that can be found in the United States. Ulithian has about 3039 speakers, 700 of which reside in Ulithi itself. Many of the other Pacific languages spoken in the surrounding islands are similar to Ulithian which makes it easier for others to understand. In a way, it is a universal language for the area. The people who live in and around Ulithi are classified as Micronesians. Their appearances greatly vary because of all the different people who passed through the area over time. Ulithi has a strong democracy with a king by name voted by the people. Because the Ulithian language is so widely recognized, it holds a good status in the islands. It is also one of the six official languages in the Federated States of Micronesia.

Sounds

Consonants

Vowels
Ulithian has eight vowels which is a large amount for a Pacific language, innovating from a former system of five plain vowels in Proto-Oceanic.

Grammar

Reduplication
Full reduplication can be used in many ways. It can be used to show a stronger emotion, for example,  means 'jealous' and  means 'short-tempered' or 'easily set off'.

Vocabulary

Indigenous vocabulary
  – man
  – woman
  – eat
  – sleep
  – hot
  – cold
  – bored

Loanwords
At various times, Spain, Germany, Japan, and the United States had control over the islands of Ulithi. Each one of these groups left behind words that have been evolved and are now used in the Ulithian language. Linguists have used these words to trace back what items each group introduced to Ulithi.

Spain has had an influence in Ulithi since the early 1500s. They left behind things like foods, religious terms, and animals. Some examples of words from Spanish:

Since Spain passed through Ulithi for such a long period of time, the words they left were used because they actually left behind those things. Foods like the potato and squash were brought by the Spanish, so Ulithian uses words based on the Spanish words for them. Spain was also Catholic, so Catholic terms were left behind.

Japan occupied Ulithi during the time of World War I and left during or after World War II. Before the World Wars, Japan traded with Ulithi. Since the two countries were trade partners, they needed to know how to communicate. Every so often, young boys would learn the basics of Japanese and because of this, "it is not at all difficult today to find Ulithians who speak and write a bit of Japanese". Japan had such a big impact that the word for battery, remained the same in Ulithian.

Germany did not occupy Ulithi for long, so they left the least influence and there are almost no words that were left behind and still used.

In 1944, the U.S. task force arrived in Ulithi and there has been an abundance of English loan words since then. The most impact English is having on Ulithian is through the school systems.

There are some loan words that have become the official word in Ulithian, but others are used in place of another word. While the word for 'flower' was similar, the Spanish word for 'table', was directly taken to use in Ulithian. This is comparable to speaking pidgin in Hawaii.

Endangerment

Materials
As far as social media such as radio and television, there does not seem to be any in specifically Ulithian but there are some in other surrounding languages. Esikiel Lippwe states in a letter that radio and television stations are very important because they effectively educate and bring awareness to the people about things like health issues.

Vitality
According to Ethnologue, Ulithian is ranked at an EGIDS level of 5 which means that the language is being used vigorously, but not as a main language. It is most likely being used more by the older generation. There is a possibility of the language dying out, but it is still in good standing  (Ethnologue).

References

Further reading
The Armed Forces Radio Station. (1945). The "ulithi" encyclopedia. Ulithi, Western Carolines:
 
Library, Singapore, Retrieved from https://dr.ntu.edu.sg/bitstream/handle/10220/709/AMIC_1986_SEP22-26_25.pdf?sequence=1
Mellen, N., & Hancock, J. (2010). Ulithian-English dictionary. Columbia, South Carolina: Habele.
Mellen, N., & Uwel, J. (2005). Ulithian – English Dictionary. : .
People and the language. (n.d.). Retrieved from http://ulithiadventurelodge.com/?page_id=57

External links

Index cards of plant and animal names in Ulithian archived with Kaipuleohone

Chuukic languages
Languages of the Federated States of Micronesia
Yap
Endangered Austronesian languages
Severely endangered languages